Everyone You Hold is the 24th studio album by Peter Hammill, released in 1997.

Track listing
All tracks written by Peter Hammill except where noted.
 "Everyone You Hold" – 5:59
 "Personality" (Holly Hammill, Peter Hammill) – 6:04
 "Nothing Comes" – 3:56
 "From the Safe House" – 6:13
 "Phosphorescence" (Peter Hammill, Saro Cosentino) – 5:12
 "Falling Open" – 6:14
 "Bubble" – 6:30
 "Can Do" – 6:49
 "Tenderness" – 4:51

Personnel
 Peter Hammill – vocals, guitars, keyboards, bass 
 David Lord – keyboards on "Everyone You Hold"
 Manny Elias – drums, percussion on "Personality", "Phosphorescence", "Can Do" and "Tenderness"
 Hugh Banton – organ on "Personality" and "Bubble"
 Beatrice and Holly Hammill – soprano vocals on "Phosphorescence"
 Stuart Gordon – violin on "Nothing Comes" and "Phosphorescence"

Technical
Peter Hammill - recording engineer, mixing (Terra Incognita, Bath)
 Paul Ridout – design and art direction
 Leo Vaca – photography

References

External links
 

1997 albums
Peter Hammill albums